Douglas Anderson Supernaw (September 26, 1960November 13, 2020) was an American country music artist. After several years performing as a local musician throughout the state of Texas, he signed with BNA Records in 1993.

Supernaw released four studio albums in his career: Red and Rio Grande (1993), Deep Thoughts from a Shallow Mind (1994), You Still Got Me (1995), and Fadin' Renegade (1999). Between 1993 and 1996, he charted 11 singles on the Billboard Hot Country Singles & Tracks (now Hot Country Songs) charts, including "I Don't Call Him Daddy", his only No. 1 single, in late 1993.

Biography
Doug Supernaw was born on September 26, 1960, in Bryan, Texas. He grew up in Inwood Forest, and was an avid golfer and member of his high school golf team. His mother, a fan of country music, exposed him to acts such as George Jones and Gene Watson, by whose works he would later be influenced. Supernaw later attended college on a golfing scholarship. After dropping out of college in 1979, he briefly worked on an oil rig before serving as a musician in local bands. He moved to Nashville, Tennessee in 1987, where he found work as a session songwriter. After four years in Nashville, he moved back to Texas, where he founded a band called Texas Steel.

1993–1995: BNA Records
An A&R executive for RCA Records discovered Supernaw, and signed him to the label's BNA Entertainment (now BNA Records) division in 1993. That year, Supernaw released his debut album, Red and Rio Grande. Overall, four singles were released from the album, starting with "Honky Tonkin' Fool", which did not enter Top 40 on the Billboard country music charts. "Reno", the second single, reached Top 5 soon afterward, while its follow-up, "I Don't Call Him Daddy" (previously a No. 86 single in 1988 for Kenny Rogers), became Supernaw's only Number One single by the end of the year. The album went on to achieve gold certification in the United States.

A series of injuries nearly ended Supernaw's career after his first album's release. After recovering from a broken neck suffered while surfing, he was involved in a head-on car collision. Finally, he was hospitalized after a nearly-fatal case of food poisoning. Once he had recovered from the food poisoning, he recorded his second album for BNA, 1994's Deep Thoughts from a Shallow Mind. Of the album's three singles, only the Dennis Linde-penned "What'll You Do About Me" (previously a single in 1984 for Steve Earle, and in 1992 for the Forester Sisters, and recorded by Randy Travis on his 1987 album Always & Forever) entered Top 40 on the country music charts. Shortly after the second album's release, he exited BNA's roster.

Also in 1994, Supernaw was nominated for Top New Male Vocalist and Song of the Year by the Academy of Country Music, but lost in both catagories to John Michael Montgomery.

1995–1997: Giant / Sony BMG Records
In 1995, he was signed to Giant Records, where he recorded and released his third major-label album, You Still Got Me, in 1996. Although its first single, "Not Enough Hours in the Night", reached a peak of No. 3 on the country singles charts, neither of the album's other singles reached Top 40, and he left Giant Records not long afterward. He also made an appearance on Stars and Stripes Vol. 1, a 1996 compilation album issued by the Beach Boys. It featured the band performing their own songs along with other country music artists; Supernaw contributed to the track "Long Tall Texan". His first compilation album, entitled The Encore Collection, was issued by Sony BMG Special Products in 1997.

1999: Tack Records
Supernaw's third recording contract was with the small, independent Tack label, on which he released Fadin' Renegade on August 31, 1999. The album's two singles, the title track and "21–17", did not enter the country music charts.

2016–2020: B&G Records
Supernaw returned to music in 2016 in local venues in his home state of Texas. Also returning to the recording studio in 2017 on the independent B&G Records label, Supernaw re-recorded his hits as Greatest Hits, which was released on April 1, 2017. The album included two new songs: "Here's My Heart" and "The Company I Keep".

Death
Supernaw announced on February 4, 2019, that he had been diagnosed with stage IV lung and bladder cancer. He died at his home on November 13, 2020, at age 60.

Discography

Studio albums

Compilation albums

Singles

Other charted songs

Music videos

Nominations
Academy of Country Music
 1993 Top New Male Vocalist
 1993 Song of the Year - "I Don't Call Him Daddy" - written by Reed Nielsen
 1996 Video of the Year - "She Never Looks Back"

References

External links
Official website
 
 
 Entry at 45cat.com

1960 births
2020 deaths
Country musicians from Texas
American country singer-songwriters
Deaths from lung cancer
Deaths from bladder cancer
Deaths from cancer in Texas
People from Bryan, Texas
Singer-songwriters from Texas
BNA Records artists
Giant Records (Warner) artists
American male singer-songwriters
20th-century American singers
20th-century American male singers